"Every Time My Heart Calls Your Name" is a song written by Gary Heyde and J.B. Rudd, and recorded by American country music artist John Berry.  It was released in February 1996 as the fourth single from the album Standing on the Edge.  The song reached #34 on the Billboard Hot Country Singles & Tracks chart.

Critical reception
Jim Ridley of New Country magazine described the song favorably, saying that it sounded like a track from Meat Loaf's Bat Out of Hell album.

Chart performance

References

1996 singles
1995 songs
John Berry (country singer) songs
Song recordings produced by Jimmy Bowen
Capitol Records Nashville singles
Songs written by Austin Gary